Eugene Merle Shoemaker (April 28, 1928 – July 18, 1997) was an American geologist. He co-discovered Comet Shoemaker–Levy 9 with his wife Carolyn S. Shoemaker and David H. Levy. This comet hit Jupiter in July 1994: the impact was televised around the world. Shoemaker also studied terrestrial craters, such as Barringer Meteor Crater in Arizona, and along with Edward Chao provided the first conclusive evidence of its origin as an impact crater. He was also the first director of the United States Geological Survey's Astrogeology Research Program.

He was killed in a car accident while visiting an impact crater site in Australia. After his death, some of his ashes were carried to the Moon with the Lunar Prospector mission.

Early life and formal education
Shoemaker was born in Los Angeles, California, the son of Muriel May (née Scott), a teacher; and George Estel Shoemaker, who worked in farming, business, teaching, and motion pictures. His parents were natives of Nebraska. During Gene's childhood they moved between Los Angeles, New York City, Buffalo, New York and Wyoming, as George worked on a variety of jobs. George hated living in big cities, and was quite satisfied to take a job as director of education for a Civilian Conservation Corps (CCC) camp in Wyoming. His wife soon found life in a remote cabin quite unsatisfactory. They compromised, when Muriel got a teaching job in Buffalo. She could teach in the Buffalo School of Practice of the State Teachers College at Buffalo during the school year while keeping Gene with her, then both would return to Wyoming during the summers. Gene's passion for studying rocks was ignited by the science education courses offered by the Buffalo Museum of Education. He enrolled in the School of Practice in the fourth grade, and began collecting samples of minerals. Within a year, he was also taking high-school-level evening courses. The family moved back to Los Angeles in 1942, where Gene enrolled in Fairfax High School at the age of thirteen. He completed high school in three years. During that time he also played violin in the school orchestra, excelled in gymnastics, and got a summer job as an apprentice lapidary.

Shoemaker enrolled in the Caltech in 1944, at the age of sixteen. His classmates were older, more mature and on a fast track to graduate before serving in World War II. Shoemaker thrived in the fast pace and earned his bachelor's degree in 1948, at age nineteen. He immediately undertook the study of Precambrian metamorphic rocks in northern New Mexico, earning his M.Sc. degree from Caltech in 1949.

Family
While Shoemaker was attending Caltech, his roommate was Richard Spellman, a young man from Chico, California. Although Shoemaker had already enrolled in a doctoral program at Princeton University, he returned to California to serve as best man at Richard's wedding in 1950. He met Richard's sister, Carolyn, for the first time on that occasion. Carolyn was born in Gallup, New Mexico, in 1929, but the Spellman family moved to Chico soon afterward. Carolyn earned degrees from Chico State College in history and political science. She never exhibited an interest in scientific subjects while growing up, and took one geology course in college, which she found boring. Nevertheless, the couple kept in touch while Shoemaker spent the next year in Princeton, followed by a two-week vacation touring the Colorado Plateau. She reportedly told others that listening to Shoemaker explain geology turned a boring subject into an exciting and interesting pursuit of knowledge. The couple married on August 17, 1951.

The Shoemakers had three children: two daughters and one son. Carolyn saw her work as keeping house and raising the children especially after they settled in Flagstaff in the 1960s. She had tried teaching school before they married, but found the work unsatisfying. She also traveled sometimes with Gene, but stopped after she noticed that her absence affected the children. After their children were grown, Carolyn wanted something meaningful to combat the "empty nest" feeling. By then, Gene suggested that she take up astronomy and join his team looking for asteroids approaching Earth. A student working at Lowell Observatory commenced teaching her astronomy. She showed great potential and launched her career as a planetary astronomer at age 51. She continued the work until her death in 2021.

Scientific contributions 

The United States Geological Survey (USGS) hired Shoemaker in 1950, and he maintained an association with the organisation for the rest of his career. His first assignment was to search for uranium deposits in Utah and Colorado. His next mission was to study volcanic processes, since other investigators had already noticed that uranium deposits were often located in the vents of ancient volcanoes. This study led him to explore the Hopi Buttes of Northern Arizona, which happened to be near Meteor Crater.

Daniel Barringer, an entrepreneur and mining engineer who had discovered Meteor Crater in 1891, had postulated that it had been caused by the impact of a meteor. About the same time, G. K. Gilbert, the chief geologist of the USGS, examined the crater and announced that it had been created by an explosive venting of volcanic steam. A majority of scientists accepted Gilbert's explanation of the cause of the crater, and it remained the conventional wisdom until Shoemaker's investigations half a century later.

For his Ph.D. degree at Princeton (1960), under the guidance of Harry Hammond Hess, Shoemaker studied the impact dynamics of Barringer Meteor Crater.  Shoemaker noted Meteor Crater had the same form and structure as two explosion craters created from atomic bomb tests at the Nevada Test Site, notably Jangle U in 1951 and Teapot Ess in 1955. In 1960, Edward C. T. Chao and Shoemaker identified shocked quartz (coesite) at Meteor Crater, proving the crater was formed from an impact generating extremely high temperatures and pressures.  They followed this discovery with the identification of coesite within suevite at Nördlinger Ries, proving its impact origin.

Astrogeology and Apollo

In 1960, Shoemaker directed a team at the USGS center in Menlo Park, California, to generate the first geologic map of the Moon using photographs taken by Francis G. Pease.  Shoemaker also helped pioneer the field of astrogeology by founding the Astrogeology Research Program. He was prominently involved in the Lunar Ranger missions to the Moon, joining the television imaging team of Harold Urey and Gerard Kuiper, which turned into a preparatory mission for the future crewed landing.  Shoemaker was then chosen to be the principal investigator for the Surveyor program's television experiment, and then the lunar geology principal investigator for Apollo 11, Apollo 12, and Apollo 13.

Shoemaker was also involved in the training of the American astronauts.  He himself was a possible candidate for an Apollo Moon flight and was set to be the first geologist to walk on the Moon but was disqualified due to being diagnosed with Addison's disease, a disorder of the adrenal gland.  Shoemaker would train astronauts during field trips to Meteor Crater and Sunset Crater near Flagstaff. He was a CBS News television commentator on the early Apollo missions, especially the Apollo 8 and Apollo 11 missions, appearing with Walter Cronkite during live coverage of those flights.

According to David H. Levy, just before the crewed Moon landings,

He was awarded the John Price Wetherill Medal from the Franklin Institute in 1965. Coming to Caltech in 1969, he started a systematic search for Earth orbit-crossing asteroids, which resulted in the discovery of several families of such asteroids, including the Apollo asteroids. Shoemaker advanced the idea that sudden geologic changes can arise from asteroid strikes and that asteroid strikes are common over geologic time periods.  Previously, astroblemes were thought to be remnants of extinct volcanoes – even on the Moon.

Comet Shoemaker–Levy 9
In 1993, he co-discovered Comet Shoemaker–Levy 9 using the 18-inch Schmidt camera at Palomar Observatory.  This comet was unique in that it provided the first opportunity to observe the planetary impact of a comet.  Shoemaker–Levy 9 collided with Jupiter in July 1994. The resulting impact caused a massive "scar" on the face of Jupiter.

Death 
Shoemaker spent much of his later years searching for and finding several previously unnoticed or undiscovered impact craters around the world. He died on July 18, 1997, during one such expedition in a head-on car collision on the remote Tanami Track, a few hundred kilometers northwest of Alice Springs, Australia. Shoemaker's wife Carolyn was severely injured in the crash.

On July 31, 1999, some of his ashes were carried to the Moon by the Lunar Prospector space probe in a capsule designed by Carolyn Porco. Celestis, Inc. provided the service—at NASA's request—commercially, making Shoemaker's ashes the first private delivery to the lunar surface. Celestis is the memorial spaceflight company that flew the ashes of Star Trek creator Gene Roddenberry into space, as well as Star Trek actor James Doohan (“Scotty”), Mercury astronaut Gordon Cooper and hundreds of other people from around the world. Shoemaker is the only person whose remains have been placed on any celestial body outside Earth. The brass foil wrapping of Shoemaker's memorial capsule is inscribed with images of Comet Hale–Bopp ("the last comet that the Shoemakers observed together"), the Barringer Meteor Crater, and a quotation from Shakespeare's Romeo and Juliet reading

The fatal crash happened when Hale-Bopp was still visible to the naked eye, having passed perihelion and having moved into the southern celestial hemisphere.

Awards and tributes
Shoemaker received a large number of awards for his professional work. According to the obituary published by the USGS Astrogeology Science Center, these included:
 Doctorate of Science, Arizona State College, Flagstaff, 1965.
 John Price Wetherill Medal of the Franklin Institute, co-recipient with E.C.T. Chao, 1965.
 Arthur S. Flemming Award, 1966.
 Doctorate of Science, Temple University, 1967.
 NASA Medal for Scientific Achievement, 1967.
 U.S. Department of the Interior Honor Award for Meritorious Service, 1973.
 Member, U.S. National Academy of Sciences, 1980.
 U.S. Department of the Interior Distinguished Service Award, 1980.
 Arthur L. Day Medal of the Geological Society of America, 1982.
 G.K. Gilbert Award of the Geological Society of America, 1983.
 Rieser Kulturpreis, co-recipient with E.C.T. Chao and Richard Dehm, 1983.
 Honorary Doctorate of Science, University of Arizona, 1984.
 Barringer Award of the Meteoritical Society, 1984.
 Kuiper Prize of the American Astronomical Society, Division for Planetary Sciences, 1984.
 Leonard Medal of the Meteoritical Society, 1985.
 Distinguished Alumni Award of the California Institute of Technology, 1986.
 Rittenhouse Medal of the Rittenhouse Astronomical Society, co-recipient with C.S. Shoemaker, 1988.
 National Medal of Science, 1992.
 Whipple Award, American Geophysical Union, 1993.
 Fellow, American Academy of Arts and Sciences, 1993.
 AIAA Space Science Award, 1996.
 NASA Exceptional Scientific Achievement Medal, 1996.
 William Bowie Medal, American Geophysical Union, 1996.
 Special Award, American Association of Petroleum Geologists, 1997.
 Shoemaker Award, Texas Section of the American Institute of Professional Geologists, awarded posthumously, 1997.

On July 24, 1997, a memorial for Shoemaker and Jurgen Rahe was presented in the U.S. House of Representatives by California representative George E. Brown, Jr. The memorial was published in the Congressional Record. The memorial credited Shoemaker with being either the discoverer or co-discoverer of 820 asteroids and comets during his career. 

A ring-like topographic feature in Western Australia, an astrobleme previously named the "Teague ring" was renamed "Shoemaker Crater" in honor of Shoemaker. The Near Earth Asteroid Rendezvous space probe was renamed "NEAR Shoemaker" in his honor. It arrived at asteroid 433 Eros in February 2000, and landed on the asteroid after a year of orbital study. He was previously honored with the asteroid 2074 Shoemaker, discovered and named by his colleague, Eleanor F. Helin.

In their 2020 album, Human. :II: Nature., Finnish metal band Nightwish paid tribute to Shoemaker in the song "Shoemaker". Composer Tuomas Holopainen says he was inspired by his biography, which moved the entire band to tears.

List of discovered minor planets 

Shoemaker is credited by the Minor Planet Center with the co-discovery of 183 minor planets between 1977 and 1994.

Notes

References

Bibliography

External links 
 Asteroids:  Deadly Impact National Geographic videos
 USGS page about Shoemaker
 NASA page about Shoemaker 

1928 births
1997 deaths
20th-century American astronomers
20th-century American geologists
Discoverers of asteroids
Discoverers of comets
National Medal of Science laureates
Space burials
People from Los Angeles
Planetary scientists
California Institute of Technology alumni
Road incident deaths in the Northern Territory
People from Flagstaff, Arizona
United States Geological Survey personnel

Fellows of the American Academy of Arts and Sciences
Members of the United States National Academy of Sciences
Barringer Medal winners